Crespina Lorenzana is a comune (municipality) in the Province of Pisa in the Italian region Tuscany.

Geography 
Crespina Lorenzana borders the following municipalities: Casciana Terme Lari, Cascina, Collesalvetti, Fauglia, Orciano Pisano, Santa Luce.

Subdivisions 
The municipality is composed by six frazioni (towns and villages):

 Cenaia
 Crespina (municipal seat)
 Laura
 Lorenzana
 Tremoleto
 Tripalle

History 
The municipality of Crespina Lorenzana was created on 1 January 2014 by merging the former municipalities of Crespina and Lorenzana. The municipal seat is in Crespina.

References